Hechtia capituligera is a plant species in the genus Hechtia. This species is endemic to Mexico.

References

capituligera
Flora of Mexico